Naam O Nishan is a 1987 Indian Hindi-language action thriller film directed by Ajay Kashyap and produced by B.P. Verma. It stars Sanjay Dutt, Amrita Singh in the lead roles.

Cast

 Shashi Kapoor as Inspector Sangram Singh
 Sanjay Dutt as Inspector Suraj Singh
 Amrita Singh as Vanisha
 Kader Khan as Thakur Jarnail Singh / Jaspal Singh
 Nirupa Roy as Thakurain Champa Singh
 Suresh Oberoi as Zorawar / Jabhar
 Seema Deo as Mrs. Sangram Singh
 Viju Khote as Inspector Sharma
 Kamal Kapoor as Police Commissioner
Chandrashekhar as Judge
 Praveen Kumar as Jagira

Plot
Suraj lives a wealthy lifestyle with his Police Inspector dad, Sangram, mom, and sister, Chutki. He joins the Police Force, and is appointed a Police Inspector. Shortly after his appointment, his dad brings Suraj's paternal uncle, Jaspal Singh, who subsequently moves in with them. When the time comes for Chutki's marriage, her to-be father-in-law, a Police Officer himself, stops the marriage proceedings as he would like Sangram to remove Jaspal from the Singh's household. When Sangram refuses, the marriage is canceled. When Suraj questions this, Sangram refuses to provide any answers. That night Jaspal leaves without telling anyone. Suraj meets with and falls in love with Vanisha. Subsequently, Suraj is suspended from active duty, arrested and charged with killing a man named Anthony. A woman named Geeta comes to his rescue with evidence to prove his innocence. Subsequently, Geeta is killed, and Suraj swears to bring in the culprit at any and all costs. Little does Suraj know that his girlfriend, Vanisha, is plotting to kill him; Sangram is not his real father, and he was sired by a bandit known only as Jarnail Singh. Things get worse when Jarnail's rival, Jabhar alias Zoravar, finds out about Suraj's biological lineage and sets forth to have him killed - by any and all means possible.

Soundtrack
Lyrics: Indeevar

References

External links

1980s Hindi-language films
1987 films
Films scored by Anu Malik
Films directed by Ajay Kashyap